Viliami Napa'a is a Tongan rugby union player who plays for  in the Bunnings NPC. His position is Lock.

Career 
Born in Tonga, Napa'a moved to New Zealand where he was educated at Marlborough Boys' College. Napa'a made his debut for Tasman against  at Trafalgar Park in a non competition match, coming off the bench in a 26–9 win for the Mako. He was named in the squad for the 2022 Bunnings NPC as a development player.

References 

Tongan rugby union players
Living people
Rugby union locks
Tasman rugby union players
People educated at Marlborough Boys' College
Year of birth missing (living people)